Thiri Zeya Thura was a Burmese royal title, and may refer to:

 Thiri Zeya Thura of Sagaing:  Heir presumptive of Ava (r. 1400–1406); Governor of Sagaing (r. 1402–1407)
 Thiri Zeya Thura of Pakhan:  Governor of Pakhan (r. 1426–1429)
 Thiri Zeya Thura of Taungdwin:  Governor of Taungdwin (r. 1441–1470s); Governor of Toungoo (1459–1466)
 Maha Thiri Zeya Thura of Toungoo:  King of Toungoo (r. 1510–1530); Governor of Toungoo (1485–1510)